Discourse & Communication is a quarterly peer-reviewed academic journal that covers the fields of discourse analysis and social communication by focusing on topics in communication analyzed with discourse analytical methods. The journal was established in 2007 by Teun A. van Dijk, who still is the editor-in-chief.

Scope
The journal concentrates on the cross-disciplinary fields of discourse studies and communication studies, with a particular focus on qualitative, discourse analytical study of organizational and mass communication. General studies of discourse are published in its sister journal, Discourse Studies, and articles on the sociopolitical role of discourse are published in its other sister journal Discourse & Society.

Abstracting and indexing 
Discourse & Communication is abstracted and indexed in Scopus and the Social Sciences Citation Index. According to the Journal Citation Reports, its 2011 impact factor is 0.939, ranking it 31st out of 72 journals in the category "Communication".

External links
 

Quarterly journals
SAGE Publishing academic journals
Publications established in 2007
English-language journals
Communication journals